Nembhard is a surname. Notable people with the surname include:

Andrew Nembhard (born 2000), Canadian basketball player
Deshawon Nembhard (born 1994), Belizean footballer 
Harriet Nembhard (born 1967), American academic
Jessica Gordon Nembhard (born 1956), American political economist
RJ Nembhard (born 1999), American basketball player
Ruben Nembhard (born 1972), American basketball player